The Kyrgyz Wikipedia is the Kyrgyz language edition of Wikipedia. Launched on 3 June 2002, It currently has  articles. This Wikipedia has  administrators along with  registered users and  active users. It is the  largest Wikipedia hosted by Wikimedia Foundation.

References

External links
Kyrgyz Wikipedia

Wikipedias by language
Internet properties established in 2002